All Aboard! Rosie's Family Cruise is a 2006 American made-for-television documentary film that follows Rosie O'Donnell and her family along with several other families on the first-ever cruise designed for gay parents and their families. It was arranged and planned by Rosie O'Donnell and her life partner Kelli O'Donnell. The cruise ship set sail on July 11, 2004, and the film debuted on April 6, 2006 on HBO. The film was released on DVD-Video on June 13, 2006. The film went on to be nominated for three Emmy Awards.

Synopsis
The film follows the maiden voyage of R Family Vacations, the travel company founded by Rosie and Kelli O'Donnell which specializes in gay family vacations. The cruise starts in New York City on July 11, 2004, and sails along the U.S. East Coast, stopping in Key West, Florida, and then in Nassau, Bahamas. Five hundred families attended the cruise, including LGBT parents as well as non-LGBT people. In the film, Rosie and Kelli's family, along with several other families on the cruise are interviewed, including former Hawaiian NFL star Esera Tuaolo along with his partner and their children. Comedian Judy Gold also makes appearances.

When the ship stops in the Bahamas, the cruise members are met with protests from some local Christians, though interviews show that there were many locals who did not have a problem with LGBT people and did not agree with the action of the protesters. Despite the protests, the trip continued as normal to the end.

References

External links
 Official HBO Site
 
 

2006 documentary films
2006 television films
2006 films
2006 LGBT-related films
American documentary films
American LGBT-related films
Documentary films about families
Documentary films about LGBT topics
Rosie O'Donnell
HBO documentary films
2000s English-language films
Films directed by Shari Cookson
2000s American films